Piotr Wadecki (born 11 February 1973) is a Polish former professional road racing cyclist, who last worked as the general manager of UCI WorldTeam .

Team membership
A professional from 1997, Wadecki has been a member of the following professional teams: Mróz(-Supradyn Witamin) (1997–2000), Domo–Farm Frites/Lotto Domo (now Predictor–Lotto) (2001–2002), Quick-Step–Davitamon (2003), Lotto–Domo (2004), Intel–Action (2005), and CCC Polsat (2006).

Biography
In 2000, Wadecki won 15 victories in races counted under the Union Cycliste Internationale's points scheme
.

On 15 March 2002, Wadecki was seriously injured in a final sprint in stage 1 (Massa Lubrense-Sorrento, 124 km) of the 37th Tirreno–Adriatico. He suffered skull fractures and a broken wrist.

When transferring from Lotto–Domo to Intel–Action, in 2005, Wadecki was ranked second place in the world. He had achieved a total of 32 wins thus far. While in the Intel–Action Team, Wadecki competed in both the Giro d'Italia and Tour de France.

Major results
Sources:

1991
 1st  Overall Coupe du Président de la Ville de Grudziądz
1993
 2nd Overall Course de la Solidarité Olympique
1994
 2nd Overall Circuit des Mines
 5th Overall Tour de Pologne
1996
 1st  Overall Tour de Martinique
 2nd Grand Prix Cristal Energie
1997
 1st  Road race, National Road Championships
 1st  Overall Course de la Solidarité Olympique
1st Stages 1 & 3
 1st Stage 1 Bałtyk–Karkonosze Tour
 4th CoreStates Invitational
 5th Overall Tour of Japan
1st Stage 5
 9th Grand Prix de Denain
1998
 3rd Overall Peace Race
 9th Overall Tour de Langkawi
1999
 1st  Overall Szlakiem Grodów Piastowskich
1st Stage 2
 1st Stage 11 Volta a Portugal
 1st Memorial A. Kacziny
 2nd Overall Bałtyk–Karkonosze Tour
1st Stages 3, 5 & 6
 5th Overall Tour de Pologne
1st Stage 5
2000
 National Road Championships
1st  Road race
1st  Time trial
 1st  Overall Peace Race
 1st  Overall Szlakiem Grodów Piastowskich
1st Stages 1, 2 & 6b
 1st First Union Wilmington Classic
 1st Stage 4 Bałtyk–Karkonosze Tour
 2nd Overall Tour de Pologne
1st Stage 1
 2nd Overall Tour of Japan
1st Stage 2
 3rd Overall Tour d'Egypte
1st Stages 4, 5 & 6
 7th Road race, Summer Olympics
 8th Hel van het Mergelland
2001
 1st Stage 5 Paris–Nice
 2nd Overall Giro della Provincia di Lucca
1st Stage 2
 6th Road race, UCI Road World Championships
 7th Clásica de San Sebastián
 8th GP Industria & Commercio di Prato
2002
 2nd Overall Tour de Suisse
 6th Trofeo Luis Puig
2003
 2nd Overall Tour de Luxembourg
 8th Classique des Alpes
 9th Rund um Köln
2005
 1st  Overall Course de la Solidarité Olympique
1st Stage 2
 1st Pomorski Klasyk
 3rd Overall Hessen Rundfahrt
1st Stage 2
 3rd Druivenkoers Overijse
 6th Overall Giro del Capo

References

External links
Piotr Wadecki, Ludzie Wprost 
Piotr Wadecki
sports.pl – Piotr Wadecki u Sprucha 
Le Palmarès de Piotr Wadecki (The Placings of Piotr Wadecki)
BBC Sport Online: Other Sports, 16 March 2001, Wadecki wins first elite stage, Paris–Nice, 5th stage, Berre L'Etang to St Raphael

Polish male cyclists
1973 births
Living people
Olympic cyclists of Poland
Cyclists at the 2000 Summer Olympics
People from Elbląg
Sportspeople from Warmian-Masurian Voivodeship